Nuttby is a community in Colchester County, Nova Scotia, Canada.

References
 Nuttby on Destination Nova Scotia

Communities in Colchester County
General Service Areas in Nova Scotia